South Gloucestershire and Stroud College, also known as SGS College, is a college of further education and higher education based in South Gloucestershire and Stroud, England. It was established in February 2012 following the merger of Filton College and Stroud College. The college is made up of six campuses located in and around Bristol, North Bristol, South Gloucestershire and Stroud. In 2021, the college launched a University Centre at its WISE campus after being awarded university centre status by the Department for Education.

History
South Gloucestershire and Stroud College was formed when Filton College and Stroud College merged in early 2012.

Filton College was founded in 1960 as Filton Technical College. By 1965 the college had over 2000 students, many of whom were part-time. In 1990 the college officially changed its name to Filton College. The next major development for the college was in 2005 when the WISE Campus (West of England Institute of Specialist Education) was opened, at a cost of £17.5 million. It is dedicated to performing arts, fine art and sport.

Stroud College started in the School of Art in 1860.  This was later renamed The Technical College, and was located in various buildings in Stroud. Only in the 1950s, after the town council was gifted Stratford Park, did the college relocate to the present campus on Stratford Road.  The Art Department remained for many years in the Art School in Stroud. The Gloucestershire College of Art was created from the merger of the Stroud School of Art and the Cheltenham College of Art in 1959.

Courses
SGS provides a number of qualifications including GCSE and A-level, as well as a number of vocational courses leading to BTEC First and National Diplomas and other similar qualifications, and some higher education courses leading HND, foundation degrees and full BA/BSc (Hons) degrees through partnership with the university of Gloucestershire It also runs EFL programmes for non-native speakers of English.

Campuses
South Gloucestershire and Stroud College (SGS) has seven campuses, Filton, WISE, Queens Road, Clifton, Stroud, Berkeley Green and Horizon.

SGS Filton
The Filton campus of the college is located in Filton Avenue, Filton, Bristol.
A-level students attend classes at the main A-level Block (A-Block), adjacent to the main campus or in classrooms within the main site. At the A-level Block there is a small cafe selling hot drinks and a few hot meals.

BTEC/National Diploma students attend classes in the main block or in the Arts block (F-Block). Media/Photography Students attend classes in F-Block, which is across the car park from the main site or at WISE.

The campus has a refectory where hot food is served, a small sweet shop, and a Student Centre. CIC painted a mural in the canteen of the Filton campus, where Inkie and Felix Braun were students.

It has a workshop area known as Bristol Construction Academy which takes place in "R-Block". The college teaches a variety of trades, including plumbing, brick laying, gas and engineering.

SGS WISE
The WISE (West of England Institute of Specialist Education) campus is located in New Road, Stoke Gifford adjacent to Abbeywood Community School opened in 2005 at a cost of £17.5 million. It is the main site for sports, performing and visual arts courses at the college. WISE is home to the Bristol Institute of Performing Arts (BIPA), Bristol School of Art, SGS Sport and since 2021 University Centre WISE.

SGS Sport has partnerships with Bristol Flyers basketball team, Bristol Rovers, Bristol Rugby and Gloucestershire County Cricket Club, and the women's football team, Bristol Academy W.F.C., plays at the highest level in England, the FA WSL. Stoke Gifford Stadium is the arena that hosts the association football, american football and athletics which was opened in 2011.

The Bristol Institute of Performing Arts (BIPA) is based in the first wing of the WISE campus and offers a range of further and higher education degree courses.

Degree Courses

 BA (Hons) Musical Theatre
 BA (Hons) Drama and Performance
 BA (Hons) Acting & Touring Theatre 
 BA (Hons) Commercial Dance for Stage & Screen
 FdA Live Events Production
 FdA Digital Media 
 BA (Hons) Specialist Make-Up Design
 BA (Hons) Prosthetics, Modelmaking & Digital Design

BIPA's facilities include 6 dance studios, 5 acting/rehearsal studios, TV studio, Mac editing suits, scenic workshop, wardrobe department, study zone, gym, theatre bar and The Olympus Theatre and Studio 22 theatre which puts on over 40 productions a year.

In 2021, the college launched its University Centre after remodelling its existing WISE Campus to accommodate additional degree students. The University Centre officially opened as University Centre WISE | West of England Institute of Specialist Education on Friday 19 November 2021.

SGS Stroud
The Stroud campus is located in Stratford Road, Stroud. The campus has a remote education centre located in Dursley, Gloucestershire, and a co-operative sixth form site at Downfield Sixth Form with Marling School, Stroud High School and Archway School. The Stroud campus has a learning resource centre, construction workshops, learn IT centre, Envy hair and beauty salon, refectory, conference facilities as well as sports and leisure facilities.

SGS Queens Road (Bristol School of Art)
The SGS Queens Road Campus is located in the right wing of the Royal West of England Academy in Queens Road, Clifton, Bristol. The academy was Bristol's first art gallery and constructed in 1857.

SGS Clifton at Bristol Zoo Gardens
The SGS Clifton Campus is located at Bristol Zoo Gardens, Clifton, Bristol. The Clifton campus offers two degree courses in Zoological Management and Conservation.

SGS Berkeley Green
SGS Berkeley Green opened in September 2017. The site is a 50-acre technology park, centred on the former Berkeley Nuclear Laboratories just south of the Berkeley Nuclear Power Station. Its main building, the John Huggett Engineering Hall, was converted from the laboratories former engineering hall building. The Berkeley Green campus is also home to the Berkeley Green UTC, part of the SGS Multi Academy Trust.

SGS Horizon - Construction Training Centre

SGS Horizon opened in February 2023. The training centre is located on the Horizon 38 Business Park, within a mile of the SGS Filton Campus and dedicated to the delivery of construction-based apprenticeship training.

University Centre 

In 2021 the college successfully applied to the Department for Education for University Centre status in recognition of its high achieving National Student Survey results. This followed a score of 94% overall degree student satisfaction in 2020 which was the highest in Bristol. The college then launched its University Centre after a remodelling of the existing WISE campus. Since September 2021 most of the college's higher education provision has been at the University Centre.

Notable alumni

 Milk Teeth (band) Punk band formed at the Stroud Campus
Aimee Palmer - Professional football player who plays for Bristol City W.F.C. and has represented Manchester United W.F.C.
 Scott Baldwin (rugby player) Professional rugby player representing Ospreys and Wales
 Justin Lee Collins, BTEC Performing Arts
 Darren Dawidiuk, English rugby union footballer who plays for Gloucester Rugby
 Taulupe Faletau, Professional rugby player representing Newport Gwent Dragons and Wales
 Stephen Gill, photographer and artist
 Michael Green, English footballer who plays for Gloucester City
 Mitch Hewer, Actor from the TV series Skins
 Sajid Javid, English Conservative Party politician, former Chancellor of the Exchequer, and Member of Parliament (MP) for the Bromsgrove constituency (Filton Technical College)
 Steffan Jones, Professional rugby player representing Newport Gwent Dragons
 Chris Lines, English footballer who plays for Bristol Rovers
 Craig Miles, English cricketer who currently plays for Gloucestershire
 Darren Mullings, English footballer who plays for Gloucester City A.F.C.
 Lamar Powell, English footballer.
 Precious Lara Quigaman, Miss International 2005
 Sean Rigg, English footballer who plays for Oxford United
 Ben Swallow, Welsh footballer who plays for Bromley
 Dan Watchurst, Welsh rugby union player for Newport RFC and the Newport Gwent Dragons
 Vanessa Winship
 Will Bayley, British table tennis player

Gallery

References

External links

 
Further education colleges in Bristol
Further education colleges in South Gloucestershire District
Further education colleges in Gloucestershire
Stroud
Culture in Bristol
Theatres in Bristol
Drama schools in the United Kingdom
Sports academies
Educational institutions established in 2012
2012 establishments in England